John Randal Tyson (born ) is an American businessman who is the chief financial officer at Tyson Foods. He was previously its chief sustainability officer from 2019 to 2022.Joined & Attended  WEF in Davos January 2023

Life 
Tyson was born . He is the son of businessman John H. Tyson. He completed a bachelor's degree in economics at Harvard College and a M.B.A. from the Stanford Graduate School of Business.

Tyson worked for JPMorgan Chase and was also a private equity and venture capital investor. He was a lecturer at the Sam M. Walton College of Business.

In 2019, Tyson became the chief sustainability officer of Tyson Foods, succeeding Justin Whitmore. Tyson was promoted to chief financial officer of Tyson Foods in September 2022, succeeding Stewart Glendinning. 

On November 6, 2022, Tyson was arrested and charged with criminal trespassing and public intoxication. He allegedly entered a random Fayetteville home and was found sleeping in the resident's bed.

References 

Living people
Year of birth missing (living people)
Tyson Foods people
Place of birth missing (living people)
21st-century American businesspeople
Harvard College alumni
Stanford Graduate School of Business alumni
American chief financial officers
Businesspeople from Arkansas
1980s births